The Harvard Business Law Review (HBLR) is a bi-annual legal journal published at Harvard Law School. It is one of the nation's premier sources for legal thought and analysis on subjects including: corporate governance, securities law, capital markets, financial regulation and institutions, financial distress and bankruptcy, and related subjects. Authors published in the journal include leading scholars, practitioners, and policymakers in their respective fields.

While being run and published by students, the Harvard Business Law Review has an Advisory Board consisting of a number of tenured Professors at Harvard Law School, including Lucian Bebchuk, Mark J. Roe, Guhan Subramanian, and also practitioners, including Paul N. Watterson, Jr., Elizabeth M. Schubert, and Warren Motley.

References 

Harvard Business School
Harvard Business Publishing